Hellenurme is a village in Valga County in southeastern Estonia. Hellenurme was the administrative centre of Palupera Parish. The village has a population of 170 (as of 1 January 2011).

Hellenurme Manor
Hellenurme estate was first mentioned in 1641, when it belonged to the Wrangells. After the Great Northern War the owners were the Dückers and Bruiningks, from 1850 till dispossession in 1919 it belonged to the Middendorffs. The one-storey main building was built out of stone in the end of the 18th century and was changed in the 19th century. Nowadays a nursery and a kindergarten operate there. About a kilometre from the manor's centre is a Classicist chapel and family graveyard of the Middendorffs. The world-famous zoologist and explorer Alexander von Middendorff who lived in the manor from 1842 to 1845 is buried there. 1865–1866 Estonian national awakening leader Jakob Hurt was a private tutor in Hellenurme Manor.

The Tartu–Valga railway passes Hellenurme on its western side; the nearest station is located 4 km away in Palupera village.

Gallery

References

External links
Hellenurme Manor at Estonian Manors Portal

Villages in Valga County
Kreis Dorpat